Goldwörth is a municipality in the district of Urfahr-Umgebung in the Austrian state of Upper Austria.

Geography
Goldwörth lies in the upper Mühlviertel.

References

Cities and towns in Urfahr-Umgebung District